Mahendra Mashru is an Indian politician from Gujarat. He was a Member of Legislative assembly from Junagadh constituency from 1990 as an independent. He later joined Bharatiya Janata Party and won from the same seat in 1998, 2002, 2007 and 2012.

He lost in 2017 Gujarat Legislative Assembly election from Junagadh against Indian National Congress candidate Bhikhabhai Joshi.

He lives simple life. He had not accepted a salary as a member of legislative assembly and used public transport to attend sessions of the legislative assembly.

References

Living people
Bharatiya Janata Party politicians from Gujarat
Gujarat MLAs 2007–2012
Gujarat MLAs 2012–2017
Year of birth missing (living people)
Gujarat MLAs 1990–1995
Gujarat MLAs 1995–1998
Gujarat MLAs 1998–2002
Gujarat MLAs 2002–2007